Isaiah DeQuincey Newman (April 17, 1911 - July 31, 1985) was an American civil rights activist, Methodist pastor, and state senator from the US state of South Carolina. He is credited with assisting in the foundation of the Democratic Progressive Party, and serving as the state field director for the South Carolina National Association for the Advancement of Colored People (NAACP) from 1960 to 1969.

Early life 
Newman was born in Darlington County, South Carolina, to Reverend Melton C. Newman and Charlotte Elizabeth Morris. As an 8-year-old, Newman witnessed the Ku Klux Klan set fire to a caboose holding an arrested African American man. Hearing his screams, Newman begged his father to help the man. His father didn't. Newman later said that incident spurred his pursuit for a just society. "I tell you I put that in my memory bank. I kept that in my heart for a long time and I held it against my father. There was a man being burned alive, and my father wouldn't turn a hand to help him. Of course, I learned since then had he gone to give help, he would have been shot down, just killed."He graduated from high school at Claflin College. He was ordained in the United Methodist Church in 1931. He later received a bachelor of arts degree from Clark College and a divinity degree from Gammon Theological Seminar, both in Atlanta, Georgia. He would serve in United Methodist Churches in Georgia and South Carolina for the next forty years.

NAACP service 
In 1943, Newman helped organize a branch of the NAACP in Orangeburg, South Carolina. He would serve in various roles within the South Carolina NAACP before becoming state field director in 1960 - a position he would serve in until 1969. His tenure saw a changing South Carolina that included such events as the Orangeburg Massacre, where the South Carolina National Guard shot and killed three South Carolina State College (now University) students.

Political service 
Newman was originally a member of the Republican Party, but he found himself increasingly dissatisfied with its position on segregation. Newman would be present at the first organizing convention of the Progressive Democratic Party, a black-led party with focuses on equality and desegregation. By 1958, he had switched his membership to the Democratic Party, where he served as a delegate to the 1968, 1972, and 1980 Democratic National Conventions.

After his tenure with the NAACP, Newman served as the director of the Governor's Office of Rural Development (also referred to as the Governor's Rural Regional Coordination Demonstration Project) from 1975 to 1981; this was a position that focused on combating poverty and hunger in South Carolina's rural areas.

In 1983, Newman was the first African American elected to the South Carolina State Senate since Reconstruction in 1887.

Later life and legacy 
In 1985, Newman resigned from the South Carolina Senate as he struggled with lung cancer and emphysema. He died in Columbia on October 21, 1985.

In 1986, the Richland County Legislative Delegation and the Highway Commission dedicated South Carolina Highway 277 as the "I. DeQuincey Newman Freeway."

In 2001, the University of South Carolina created the I. DeQuincey Newman Institute for Peace and Social Justice and an endowed chair position of the same name, held in the College of Social Work.

References

External links 
 Isaiah DeQuincey Newman Papers (fully digitized) at South Carolina Political Collections, University of South Carolina
 I. DeQuincey Newman Institute for Peace and Social Justice
 Reverend Isaiah DeQuincey Newman House in Columbia, South Carolina

1911 births
1985 deaths
Deaths from lung cancer
Deaths from emphysema
South Carolina Democrats
People from Darlington County, South Carolina
Clark College alumni
NAACP activists
South Carolina state senators
American Christian religious leaders
South Carolina Republicans
African-American state legislators in South Carolina
Activists from South Carolina
20th-century American politicians
20th-century African-American politicians